The 2011 Wimbledon Championships was a tennis tournament played on grass courts at the All England Lawn Tennis and Croquet Club in Wimbledon, London in the United Kingdom. It was the 125th edition of the Wimbledon Championships and were held from 20 June to 3 July 2011. It was the third Grand Slam tennis event of the year and was part of the ATP World Tour, the WTA Tour, the ITF Junior Tour, the NEC Tour and the London Prepares series of test events for the following year's London Olympics. The championships were organised by the All England Lawn Tennis and Croquet Club and the International Tennis Federation.

In the professional tournaments there were two new singles champions for the first time since 2002: Novak Djokovic and Petra Kvitová. By reaching the final Djokovic also claimed the World No. 1 in the ATP rankings from Rafael Nadal, while Kvitová became the first Grand Slam event winner born in the 1990s. In the doubles the Bryan brothers claimed the men's title for a second time, and equalled the overall Grand Slam tournament record of 11 set by the Woodies, Mark Woodforde and Todd Woodbridge. In the women's doubles Katarina Srebotnik won her first ladies major title after making four previous major finals. Srebotnik won alongside Květa Peschke; this was Peschke's first major title. In the mixed doubles Jürgen Melzer won his second major title, and first in the mixed doubles as he partnered Iveta Benešová to her first major title. In total, players from the Czech Republic (Kvitová, Peschke, and Benešová) were champions in three of the five main tour events in the tournament.

In the junior tournaments both the boys and girls singles titles were won by Australians. Luke Saville won the boys title while Ashleigh Barty became the first Australian in 31 years to win the girls title. In the doubles there was home success as Brit George Morgan and Croatian Mate Pavić won their maiden junior Grand Slam tournament titles. The girls doubles title was claimed by Canadian Eugenie Bouchard and American Grace Min.

In the wheelchair events Esther Vergeer and Sharon Walraven retained their doubles title. This was Vergeer's third successive win at the championships and meant that she was still unbeaten at Wimbledon. In the men's event Maikel Scheffers and Ronald Vink completed a team career Grand Slam, as they won the only title they had previously failed to win as a team.

The legends events titles were won by the teams of: Lindsay Davenport and Martina Hingis, the Dutch pair of Jacco Eltingh and Paul Haarhuis, and the Australian pair of Pat Cash and Mark Woodforde.

Tournament

The 125th edition of the tournament saw two new courts opened. A new showcourt, Court No. 3, and a new Court No. 4 opened on the first day of the championships. Court No. 3 was opened by The Duke of Kent, President of the All England Lawn Tennis and Croquet Club, who unveiled a plaque marking the occasion. A total of 19 courts were used for competition play and a further 22 for practice. The capacity of the grounds was thus increased by 1,000 to 38,500.

On a commercial front, Sony became a sponsor of the championships for the first time, while Jacob's Creek and Lavazza replaced Blossom Hill and Nescafe as official wine and coffee of the tournament. Qualifying for all events took place at the Bank of England Sports Ground, Roehampton. The grass was of the Perennial Ryegrass type and cut to 8mm.

125th anniversary
The 2011 championships were the 125th to be held since 1877, excluding the years 1915–1918 and 1940–1945, when the event was not held due to the two world wars. To mark the occasion a number of special events and activities occurred. Blue Peter broadcast a special programme looking at the championships, past, present and future, which was screened on the second Monday of the tournament. Four 30-minute documentaries charting the history of the championships were commissioned. A new exhibition known as the queue was held in the All England Club's Museum celebrating the people who queue each year for tickets to the championship. In addition, a range of licensed merchandise featuring the "125" logo was released; the ball boy and ball girl uniforms had this logo. The shoes provided by Fila had the words "125 years" and the logo printed on them. The balls provided by Slazenger also had "125 years" stamped onto them, and a special can design was used. Lanson champagne, which is served on the grounds, had "125 years" stamped on the bottle. Finally, to celebrate the anniversary there was a community art project in which participants were asked to "interpret" an unstrung wooden tennis racket "in a medium of their choosing".

HSBC held a series of polls on the Wimbledon website to find the 10 greatest things about the championships. The polls consisted of anything from greatest character to best final. In addition the bank also teamed up with the Sports Technology Institute at Loughborough University; to predict how tennis would develop over the next 25 years up to 2036; the 150th Wimbledon and 100 years since Fred Perry, the last British male winner of the championships, won.

Point and prize money distribution

Point distribution
Below are the tables with the point distribution for each discipline of the tournament.

Senior points

Wheelchair points

Junior points

Prize money
The total prize money for 2011 championships was £14,600,000. The winner of the men's and women's singles title earned £1,100,000.

* per team

Singles players
Gentlemen's singles

Ladies' singles

Day-by-day summaries

Champions

Seniors

Men's singles

 Novak Djokovic def.  Rafael Nadal, 6–4, 6–1, 1–6, 6–3 
It was Djokovic's 8th title of the year and 26th of his career. It was his 2nd slam of the year and 3rd of his career. It was his first Wimbledon title.

Women's singles

 Petra Kvitová def.  Maria Sharapova, 6–3, 6–4 
 It was Kvitová's first Major title, 4th title of the year, and 5th title of her career. She was also the first Grand Slam tournament champion of either gender to be born in the 1990s.

Men's doubles

 Bob Bryan /  Mike Bryan def.  Robert Lindstedt /  Horia Tecău, 6–3, 6–4, 7–6(7–2) 
 It was the Bryan brothers's second Wimbledon title, 6th title of the year, and 73rd title as a team. With this title they equalled the Woodies' Open era record of 11 men's Grand Slam doubles titles.

Women's doubles

 Květa Peschke /  Katarina Srebotnik def.  Sabine Lisicki /  Samantha Stosur, 6–3, 6–1 
 It was Peschke's first Wimbledon title, 4th title of the year, and 20th title of her career. It was Srebotnik's first Wimbledon title, 3rd title of the year, and 27th title of her career.

Mixed doubles

 Jürgen Melzer /  Iveta Benešová def.  Mahesh Bhupathi /  Elena Vesnina, 6–3, 6–2

Juniors

Boys' singles

 Luke Saville def.  Liam Broady, 2–6, 6–4, 6–2

Girls' singles

 Ashleigh Barty def.  Irina Khromacheva, 7–5, 7–6(7–3)

Boys' doubles

 George Morgan /  Mate Pavić def.  Oliver Golding /  Jiří Veselý, 3–6, 6–4, 7–5

Girls' doubles

 Eugenie Bouchard /  Grace Min def.  Demi Schuurs /  Tang Haochen, 5–7, 6–2, 7–5

Invitation

Gentlemen's invitation doubles

 Jacco Eltingh /  Paul Haarhuis def.  Jonas Björkman /  Todd Woodbridge, 3–6, 6–3, [13–11]

Ladies' invitation doubles

 Lindsay Davenport /  Martina Hingis def.  Martina Navratilova /  Jana Novotná, 6–4, 6–4

Senior gentlemen's invitation doubles

 Pat Cash /  Mark Woodforde def.  Jeremy Bates /  Anders Järryd, 6–3, 5–7, [10–5]

Wheelchair

Wheelchair men's doubles

 Maikel Scheffers /  Ronald Vink def.  Stéphane Houdet /  Michaël Jérémiasz, 7–5, 6–2

Wheelchair women's doubles

 Esther Vergeer /  Sharon Walraven def.  Jiske Griffioen /  Aniek van Koot, 6–4, 3–6, 7–5

Broadcast

The 2011 tournament was broadcast in 185 countries. The BBC was the host broadcaster and, since the All England Club had made a deal with Sony, some of the tournament was broadcast in 3D for the first time. To mark the 125th anniversary, the BBC broadcast a documentary the night before the start of the tournament (19 June 2011), called 125 years of Wimbledon: You Cannot Be Serious, looking back at memorable moments.

In the United States, the championship matches aired on NBC for the 43rd and final year. The network issued a statement saying it had been outbid for the rights to future broadcasts. Cable sports channel ESPN, which had already been sharing Wimbledon coverage with NBC, became the exclusive American broadcaster of the tournament for a 12-year period, beginning in 2012. Under the agreement, all matches were to air live, as opposed to tape delaying some matches, a practice for which NBC had been criticised.

Attendance
 Members of the British Royal Family attended the championships. With the Duchess of Cornwall (Camilla) attending the tournament on the first Wednesday, on official duty, where she met six ball boys and girls before watching the days play on Centre court from the Royal box. While on the second Monday, the Duke and Duchess of Cambridge (Prince William and Catherine) attended the championships, while on a private visit. The pair took in all three matches on Centre Court. After the first match, which was won by British player Andy Murray, the pair briefly met him, after the Scot bowed towards them while on court at the end of the match.

On the second Monday temperatures topped 30 degrees, and a 146 patrons needed medical assistance by 16:30, due to the heat. This was a significant rise compared to other days as in the two days previous days of the championships 90 and 87 people were treated respectively.

Protests
On the middle Saturday, 14 people were arrested at the gate when trying to obtain access to the grounds. The All England Club shut the gates of the ground forcing spectators who had camped overnight to wait outside for 45 minutes before letting them in at 11.15 am. The group wore yellow shirts and had paint and other equipment to make banners once inside of the ground. A source stated that the group were planning to demonstrate against government policy.

Singles seeds
The following are the seeded players and notable players who withdrew from the event. Seedings are based on ATP and WTA rankings as of 13 June 2011. Rankings and points are as of before 20 June 2011.

Men's singles
The Men's singles seeds is arranged on a surface-based system to reflect more accurately the individual player's grass court achievement as per the following formula:
ATP Entry System Position points as at a week before The Championships
Add 100% points earned for all grass court tournaments in the past 12 months
add 75% points earned for best grass court tournament in the 12 months before that.

Women's singles
For the Women's singles seeds, the seeding order follows the ranking list, except where in the opinion of the committee, the grass court credentials of a particular player necessitates a change in the interest of achieving a balanced draw.

†Serena Williams was ranked 26 on the day when seeds were announced. Nevertheless, she was deemed a special case and seeded 7th by the organizers because she missed a significant portion of the last 12-month period due to knee injury.

The following players would have been seeded, but they withdrew from the event.

Main draw wild card entries
The following players received wild cards into the main draw senior events.

Men's singles
  Arnaud Clément
  Daniel Cox
  Dan Evans
  Alejandro Falla
  Gilles Müller
  Dudi Sela
  James Ward

Women's singles
  Naomi Broady
  Eleni Daniilidou
  Sabine Lisicki
  Katie O'Brien
  Laura Robson
  Heather Watson
  Emily Webley-Smith

Men's doubles
  Daniel Cox /  James Ward
  Jamie Delgado /  Jonathan Marray
  Chris Eaton /  Josh Goodall
  Colin Fleming /  Ross Hutchins
  Lleyton Hewitt /  Peter Luczak

Women's doubles
  Sarah Borwell /  Melanie South
  Naomi Broady /  Emily Webley-Smith
  Anne Keothavong /  Laura Robson
  Jocelyn Rae /  Heather Watson

Mixed doubles
  Jamie Delgado /  Melanie South
  Colin Fleming /  Jocelyn Rae
  Ross Hutchins /  Heather Watson
  Jonathan Marray /  Anne Keothavong
  Ken Skupski /  Elena Baltacha

Protected ranking
The following players were accepted directly into the main draw using a protected ranking: 

Men's Singles
  Fernando González
  Tommy Haas
  Ivo Karlović

Women's Singles
  Melinda Czink

Qualifiers entries
Below are the lists of the qualifiers entering in the main draws.

Men's singles

Men's singles qualifiers
  Andreas Beck
  Karol Beck
  Ruben Bemelmans
  Flavio Cipolla
  Frank Dancevic
  Kenny de Schepper
  Rik de Voest
  Martin Fischer
  Łukasz Kubot
  Lukáš Lacko
  Marinko Matosevic
  Conor Niland
  Édouard Roger-Vasselin
  Igor Sijsling
  Cedrik-Marcel Stebe
  Bernard Tomic

Lucky losers
  Simone Bolelli
  Marc Gicquel
  Ryan Harrison
  Go Soeda
  Grega Žemlja

Women's singles

Women's singles qualifiers
  Mona Barthel
  Chang Kai-chen
  Vitalia Diatchenko
  Misaki Doi
  Marina Erakovic
  Irina Falconi
  Camila Giorgi
  Alexa Glatch
  Kristýna Plíšková
  Tamarine Tanasugarn
  Lesia Tsurenko
  Aleksandra Wozniak

Lucky losers
  Stéphanie Dubois
  Stéphanie Foretz Gacon

Men's doubles

Men's doubles qualifiers
  Karol Beck /  David Škoch
  Ryan Harrison /  Travis Rettenmaier
  Treat Huey /  Izak van der Merwe
  David Rice /  Sean Thornley

Lucky losers
  Flavio Cipolla /  Paolo Lorenzi
  Leoš Friedl /  David Martin
  Lukáš Lacko /  Lukáš Rosol
  Alessandro Motti /  Stéphane Robert
  Sanchai Ratiwatana /  Sonchat Ratiwatana

Women's doubles

Women's doubles qualifiers
  Shuko Aoyama /  Rika Fujiwara
  Vesna Dolonc /  Katalin Marosi
  Lindsay Lee-Waters /  Megan Moulton-Levy
  Urszula Radwańska /  Arina Rodionova

Lucky losers
  Marina Erakovic /  Tamarine Tanasugarn
  Sophie Lefèvre /  Evgeniya Rodina
  Noppawan Lertcheewakarn /  Jessica Moore

Withdrawals
The following players were accepted directly into the main tournament, but withdrew with injuries or personal reasons.

Men's Singles
  Benjamin Becker → replaced by  Go Soeda
  Ričardas Berankis → replaced by  Florent Serra
  Pablo Cuevas → replaced by  Ryan Harrison
  Thiemo de Bakker → replaced by  Denis Gremelmayr
  Juan Carlos Ferrero → replaced by  Igor Andreev
  Fabio Fognini → replaced by  Marc Gicquel
  Robert Kendrick → replaced by  Grega Žemlja
  Paul-Henri Mathieu → replaced by  James Blake
  Sam Querrey → replaced by  Simone Bolelli

Women's Singles
  Gréta Arn → replaced by  Stéphanie Foretz Gacon
  Timea Bacsinszky → replaced by  Kateryna Bondarenko
  Kim Clijsters → replaced by  Stéphanie Dubois
  Gisela Dulko → replaced by  Olga Govortsova
  Alisa Kleybanova → replaced by  Patricia Mayr-Achleitner
  Dinara Safina → replaced by  Vesna Dolonc
  Patty Schnyder → replaced by  Anastasiya Yakimova
  Ágnes Szávay → replaced by  Pauline Parmentier

References

External links

 Official Wimbledon Championships website

 
Wimbledon Championships
Wimbledon Championships
Wimbledon Championships
Wimbledon Championships